The enzyme 3-hydroxyoctanoyl-[acyl-carrier-protein] dehydratase catalyzes the chemical reaction

(3R)-3-hydroxyoctanoyl-[acyl-carrier-protein]  oct-2-enoyl-[acyl-carrier-protein] + H2O

This enzyme belongs to the family of lyases, specifically the hydro-lyases, which cleave carbon-oxygen bonds.  The systematic name of this enzyme class is (3R)-3-hydroxyoctanoyl-[acyl-carrier-protein] hydro-lyase (oct-2-enoyl-[acyl-carrier protein]-forming). Other names in common use include D-3-hydroxyoctanoyl-[acyl carrier protein] dehydratase, D-3-hydroxyoctanoyl-acyl carrier protein dehydratase, beta-hydroxyoctanoyl-acyl carrier protein dehydrase, beta-hydroxyoctanoyl thioester dehydratase, beta-hydroxyoctanoyl-ACP-dehydrase, and (3R)-3-hydroxyoctanoyl-[acyl-carrier-protein] hydro-lyase.

See also

 3-hydroxypalmitoyl-[acyl-carrier-protein] dehydratase

References

 

EC 4.2.1
Enzymes of unknown structure